Hansholey is a town in the southeastern Middle Shabelle (Shabeellaha Dhexe) province of Somalia. It is located in the Jowhar District.

References
Hansholey

Populated places in Middle Shabelle